CSS Appomattox was a small propeller-driven steamer used early in the war by the Confederate Navy to defend the sounds of northeastern North Carolina. After participating in the battle for Roanoke Island, it was burned to prevent capture on February 10, 1862, near Elizabeth City, North Carolina.

Early Service
The Appomattox was originally named the Empire when launched in Philadelphia in 1850. Details of her prewar career are unknown.  In May 1861, she was chartered by the Virginia State Navy under Captain Milligan, towing blockships into position to obstruct the channels of the Elizabeth River around Norfolk. In that same month, she twice sailed as a flag-of-truce boat under Captain Thomas T. Hunter of the Virginia Navy to arrange exchanges of wounded Union prisoners and passage north from Norfolk of certain families wishing to return to their Northern friends. In the latter part of June 1861, she again served as the bearer of a flag-of-truce off Fortress Monroe, this time for Brigadier General Huger, CSA.

Confederate Service in North Carolina
Renamed Appomattox, she was armed with two guns and assigned to the waters along the North Carolina coast under the command of Lt. C. C. Simms, CSN. Appomattox was used to patrol Pamlico Sound in late January 1862.  She was also used to obstruct 
channels in the Croatan Sound area by towing block-ships to strategic points 
for sinking. (ORN 6: 787f) On February 6, the eve of Burnside's attack, the Appomattox was sent down Croatan Sound to reconnoiter the invasion force. Burnside allowed her to do this unhindered, because he wished for the Confederates to know what they were up against.

The Appomattox was one of 8 gunboats used to resist the Burnside Expedition's invasion of  Roanoke Island on 7–8 February 1862. However, she missed the actual battle, having been sent to Edenton on an unspecified mission.

She retreated with the surviving gunboats to Elizabeth City, N.C. On February 9, the Appomattox and the Sea Bird steamed back to Roanoke Island to see if any further assistance could be given to the defenders, and to evacuate the garrison at Fort Forrest on Redstone Point. They encountered the Union gunboats advancing up the sound, and immediately fled back to Elizabeth City to organize a defense there.
 
The Confederate gunboats were attacked by the Federal gunboat fleet on February 10.  The Appomattox kept up a brisk fire from her bow gun until it was accidentally spiked.  She then retreated to the entrance of the Dismal Swamp Canal, using the stern howitzer to fire at pursuers.  Upon reaching the first lock it was discovered that her beam was 2 inches too great to let her into the canal.  As a result, Lieutenant Simms had to destroy the Appomattox by setting her on fire.

Rediscovery
On November 10, 2009 it was announced by the state Underwater Archaeology Branch that the wreck of the Appomattox had been found. The four-member diving team, comprising Philip Madre, Eddie Congleton, Jason Forbes, and Jason Madre, discovered the shipwreck in August 2007 in the Pasquotank River. They had been searching for the Appomattox for more than 10 years. The divers found a silver-plated spoon inscribed with the name of a crew member from  Appomattox, thus confirming the ship's identity.

References

Gunboats of the Confederate States Navy
Shipwrecks of the Carolina coast
Shipwrecks of the American Civil War
Maritime incidents in February 1862
Ships built in Philadelphia
1850 ships
Shipwrecks in rivers
Ship fires